The Richardson County Courthouse is a historic building in Falls City, Nebraska, and the courthouse of Richardson County, Nebraska. It was built in 1923–1925. It was designed by architect William F. Gernandt in the Classical Revival style, with "fluted engaged columns, a broad and prominent modillioned cornice, and a particularly fine two-story roundarched window.". Inside, there are two murals, including one about William Penn. The building has been listed on the National Register of Historic Places since July 5, 1990.

References

	
National Register of Historic Places in Richardson County, Nebraska
Neoclassical architecture in Nebraska
Buildings and structures completed in 1923
Courthouses on the National Register of Historic Places in Nebraska
County courthouses in Nebraska